The 2015 Thai Premier League (also known as Toyota Thai Premier League due to the sponsorship from Toyota) was the 19th season of the Thai Premier League since its establishment in 1996. A total of 18 teams competed in the league. The season began on 14 February and finished on 13 December.

Buriram United were the defending champions, having won their Thai Premier League title the previous season. Nakhon Ratchasima, Saraburi and Navy entered as the three promoted teams.

Teams
A total of 18 teams contested the league, including 15 sides from the 2014 season and three promoted from the 2014 Thai Division 1 League.

Police United, PTT Rayong, Songkhla United, Air Force Central and GSE Samut Songkhram were relegated to the 2015 Thai Division 1 League after finishing the 2014 season. They were replaced by the best three teams from the 2014 Thai Division 1 League champions Nakhon Ratchasima, runners-up Saraburi and third place Navy.

Stadiums and locations

Note: Table lists in alphabetical order.

Name changes
Osotspa Saraburi renamed themselves to Osotspa Samut Prakan.
Singhtarua renamed themselves to Port.

Stadium changes
Osotspa Samut Prakan used the M Power Stadium in Samut Prakan,  a change from the previous season where they used the Saraburi Stadium in Saraburi as their home ground in 2014.

Personnel and sponsoring
Note: Flags indicate national team as has been defined under FIFA eligibility rules. Players may hold more than one non-FIFA nationality.

Managerial changes

Foreign players
The number of foreign players is restricted to five per TPL team. A team can use four foreign players on the field in each game, including at least one player from the AFC country.

Former player are the players who were out of Thai League squad/left club in the mid-season transfer window.

Results

League table

Result table

Season statistics

Top scorers
As of 13 December 2015.

Top assists
As of 13 December 2015.

Hat-tricks

Awards

Monthly awards

Annual awards

Player of the Year
The Player of the Year was awarded to  Diogo (Buriram United).

Coach of the Year
The Coach of the Year was awarded to  Alexandre Gama  (Buriram United).

Golden Boot
The Golden Boot of the Year was awarded to  Diogo  (Buriram United).

Fair Play
The Fair Play of the Year was awarded to Army United.

Attendance

See also
 2015 Thai Division 1 League
 2015 Regional League Division 2
 2015 Thai FA Cup
 2015 Thai League Cup
 2015 Kor Royal Cup
 Thai Premier League All-Star Football

References

2015
1
2014–15 in Asian association football leagues
2015–16 in Asian association football leagues